Emese Danks is a Hungarian politician who served as spokeswoman of the Hungarian government from 1 August 2006 to 5 March 2007. She was the spokeswoman of the Tesco-Global Áruházak Zrt. between 2002 and 2006.

External links
 Korrupedia

Living people
Government spokespersons of Hungary
Place of birth missing (living people)
Year of birth missing (living people)
21st-century Hungarian politicians
21st-century Hungarian women politicians